Floyd Huddleston (August 19, 1918 - September 27, 1991) was an American songwriter, screenwriter, and television producer.

Career
Huddleston was born in Leland, Mississippi, and would later sing and write songs for Glenn Miller's Army Air Force Band during World War II. After he was discharged, Huddleston came to California where he was under contract with Decca Records in 1949. There, he co-wrote with Al Rinker an estimated 800 songs, some of which were recorded by Frank Sinatra, Judy Garland, and Sarah Vaughan. Soon after, Huddleston would compose lyrics for theater productions such as Shuffle Along and The New Ziegfeld Follies.

Later in his life, he wrote lyrics for songs in several films, including The Ballad of Josie and Midnight Cowboy. For Disney, he contributed the song, "Everybody Wants to be a Cat", to The Aristocats. For Robin Hood, he and George Bruns were nominated for an Academy Award for "Love," sung by his wife, Nancy Adams. Huddleston would also produce unused songs for a proposed version of The Rescuers with songs performed by Louis Prima with Sam Butera and the Witnesses. In 1978, he not only produced and composed songs, but wrote the script for a 1978 TV special starring Lucille Ball.

Personal life and death
On December 30, 1965, Huddleston married Nancy Adams, a commercial jingle singer, at the First Baptist Church chapel in Memphis, Tennessee. Huddleston died from a heart attack on September 27, 1991 at a hospital located in Panorama City, Los Angeles. Huddleston was survived by his wife Nancy, his son, Huston, and his mother, Hettye T. Huddleston. At the time of his death, Huddleston was working on a musical titled Brother Elwood's Gospel Truck.

Discography

With His Family Singers
 Happy Birthday Jesus (Dobre Records DR1013, 1977)

References

External links

1918 births
1991 deaths
American lyricists
Songwriters from Mississippi
20th-century American musicians
People from Leland, Mississippi